Valentina Petrillo (born 2 October 1973 as Fabrizio Petrillo) is an Italian Paralympic athlete competing in the 100, 200 and 400 m T12 class visually impaired sprint.

Petrillo has been the first transgender woman to take part in an international Paralympic Women's Championship, debuting at the Italian Paralympic Athletics Championships, a milestone for the transgender people in sports.

Biography 
Born in Naples on October 2, 1973, as Fabrizio, Petrillo started practising athletics at a young age until a loss of sight at age 14, due to a diagnosis of Stargardt disease.

Soon after finishing studies in Bologna, Fabrizio joined the Italy national futsal team for visually impaired.

At age 41, Petrillo was determined to get back into athletics, winning 11 national titles in the men's category.

In 2019 Petrillo changed names from Fabrizio to Valentina, starting a gender transitioning process; Petrillo competed for the first time in the Woman's category at the Italian Para Athletics Championships on September 11, 2020, marking the first time in Paralympic sports that a transgender person has been allowed to do so.

Petrillo’s story will be narrated through a movie, currently under development, named 5 nanomoli-Il sogno olimpico di una donna trans.

Athletics career 
Petrillo began to practise athletics at a young age, but had to stop due to Stargardt disease; at 41 years old, Petrillo returned to sport as a para athlete.

As of 2020, Petrillo competes officially in the Women's category,
and on April 25, 2021, set a new national record on the 400 meters T13 class, then improved in June of the same year.

On March 22, 2021, Petrillo set another new record, this time in 200 meters T12.

Petrillo represented Italy at the 2021 World Para Athletics European Championships, ranking 5th.

National records 
Seniores
 200 meters plain T12: 27"17 ( Ancona, 22 March 2021)
 400 meters plain indoor T13: 59"77 ( Piacenza, 20 June 2021)

See also 
 Transgender people in sports

References

External links 
 

1973 births
Living people
Paralympic athletes of Italy
Visually impaired category Paralympic competitors
Italian LGBT sportspeople
Transgender women
Transgender sportswomen
Italian blind people